The Falkland Islands general election of 1977 was held on Thursday 6 October 1977 to elect members to the Legislative Council. Six Councillors were elected through universal suffrage, one from each constituency.

The election took place just over a year after the last so that the changes to the Legislative Council under the new constitution could be implemented. The new constitution, which came into force under Falkland Islands (Legislative Council) (Amendment) Order 1977, abolished the remaining appointed members Councillors and increased the number of elected Councillors to six. The constitution also created three new constituencies (Camp, East Stanley and West Stanley) to add to the existing three (Stanley, East Falkland, West Falkland).

Results
Candidates in bold were elected.  Candidates in italic were incumbents.

Camp constituency

East Falkland constituency

East Stanley constituency

Stanley constituency

West Falkland constituency

West Stanley constituency

References

1977 elections in South America
General election
1977
Non-partisan elections
October 1977 events in South America
1977 elections in the British Empire